The Office of the Attorney General of Guam aims to serve, protect, and represent the government and the people by enforcing the laws of Guam and the United States. The Office is composed of the following divisions:

 Administration Division
 Prosecution Division
 Litigation Division
 Solicitors Division
 Consumer Counsel Division
 Juvenile Division
 Child Support Enforcement Division (CSED)

List of attorneys general (1971-present)

See also 
 Attorney general
 Justice ministry
 Politics of Guam
United States Department of Justice

References 

1971 establishments in Guam
Attorneys General of Guam
Attorneys general
Government of Guam
Guam